Gérard Thurnauer (September 24, 1926 – December 22, 2014) was a French architect and a founding member of the Atelier de Montrouge, an architectural and urban planning studio.

Biography 
Gérard Thurnauer was born in Paris to a Jewish father and a pastor's daughter. At age 15, he joined the French resistance. He studied at the École des Beaux-arts de Paris and received the prix du meilleur diplôme from his alma mater alongside Pierre Riboulet and Jean-Louis Véret in 1952.

Atelier de Montrouge 
In 1958, Gérard Thurnauer founded the Atelier de Montrouge with Jean Renaudie, Pierre Riboulet and Jean-Louis Véret, whom he met during his studies at the École des Beaux-arts de Paris. Together, they were awarded the 1981 Grand prix national de l'architecture by the French Ministry of Culture. The Atelier de Montrouge was dissolved the same year.

References 

20th-century French architects
French urban planners
1926 births
2014 deaths
Architects from Paris